Tu Lien-che (pinyin: Du Lianzhe) (1904–1994), sometimes credited also to incorporate her married name Fang, was a distinguished bibliographer and historian of China.

Early life and education 
Born in Yangliuqing as the daughter of scholar and calligrapher Du Tong , she met Fang Chao-ying while they were both students at Yenching University, where she earned her degree in history. She would become Fang's wife and lifelong collaborator.

Career 
Key works on which she worked included Eminent Chinese of the Ch'ing Period and the Dictionary of Ming Biography Of her single-authored scholarship, her work clarifying the origins of the Grand Council (Qing Dynasty) was especially well-regarded. Her younger brother Du Lianqi  was well known for his writings on theatre.

References 

Chinese historians
1904 births
1994 deaths